Scalesia villosa is a species of flowering plant in the family Asteraceae. It is found only in Ecuador. It is threatened by habitat loss.

References

villosa
Flora of Ecuador
Vulnerable plants
Taxonomy articles created by Polbot